Taiwo Owatemi (born 22 July 1992) is a British politician who has been Member of Parliament (MP) for Coventry North West since 2019. A member of the Labour Party, she was Shadow Minister for Women and Equalities from September 2021 to September 2022.

Early life 
Owatemi grew up in Plumstead, with close links to an extended family via her aunt and cousins in Coventry. Her father died when she was six. She was brought up with her twin and her elder brother by her mother, a nurse.

Owatemi has a Master's degree from the University of Kent and is qualified as a pharmacist. She worked as a pharmacist at a cancer unit in Dartford and Gravesham NHS Trust before she entered Parliament.

Political career 
Owatemi was selected for a parliamentary internship by the Social Mobility Foundation and gained experience working in the Westminster office of Conservative MP Oliver Letwin. She served in a number of roles in the Young Fabians and published writing on health policy. She was a governor of a local primary school from 2016.

She was selected as Labour's candidate for Coventry North West at the 2019 general election after the incumbent Labour MP, Geoffrey Robinson, announced his intention to stand down. Owatemi narrowly held the seat for Labour with a majority of 208 votes. She is one of three female MPs elected from Coventry in 2019, the others being Zarah Sultana and Colleen Fletcher.

In the 2020 Labour Party leadership election Owatemi nominated Lisa Nandy.

Owatemi served as Parliamentary Private Secretary (PPS) to the Shadow Home Secretary, Nick Thomas-Symonds, from April 2020 to September 2021. She was appointed as Shadow Minister for Women and Equalities in September 2021. She resigned from this position on 7 September 2022.

References

External links

 

Living people
UK MPs 2019–present
21st-century British women politicians
People from Plumstead
Labour Party (UK) MPs for English constituencies
Female members of the Parliament of the United Kingdom for English constituencies
Alumni of the University of Kent
Black British women politicians
Members of Parliament for Coventry
1992 births
Black British MPs